Academia do Lumiar is a Portuguese professional basketball team located in Lumiar, Lisbon municipality, Portugal. The team competes in the Proliga (Portugal).

Notable players
To appear in this section a player must have either:
- Set a club record or won an individual award as a professional player.
- Played at least one official international match for his senior national team or one NBA game at any time.
 Denis Neves
 Franklim Furtado

References

External links
Presentation at PROLIGA website
Presentation at Eurobasket.com

Basketball teams established in 1893
Basketball teams in Portugal
Sport in Lisbon